In mathematical logic, Lindenbaum's lemma, named after Adolf Lindenbaum, states that any consistent theory of predicate logic can be extended to a complete consistent theory. The lemma is a special case of the ultrafilter lemma for Boolean algebras, applied to the Lindenbaum algebra of a theory.

Uses
It is used in the proof of Gödel's completeness theorem, among other places.

Extensions
The effective version of the lemma's statement, "every consistent computably enumerable theory can be extended to a complete consistent computably enumerable theory," fails (provided Peano arithmetic is consistent) by Gödel's incompleteness theorem.

History
The lemma was not published by Adolf Lindenbaum; it is originally attributed to him by Alfred Tarski.

Notes

References
 

Mathematical logic
Lemmas